Live Blood is the third live album by the English rock musician Peter Gabriel. Recorded at the HMV Hammersmith Apollo, London on 23 and 24 March 2011, the concert featured Gabriel singing with the New Blood Orchestra and vocalists Ane Brun, Melanie Gabriel, Sevara Nazarkhan and Tom Cawley.

The setlist included songs from his previous orchestral covers album Scratch My Back and new orchestral arrangements of his solo songs, most of which went on to appear on the studio album New Blood. A single CD version of Live Blood formed part of the New Blood Deluxe Edition DVD released in 2011. The concerts were filmed in 3D.

The orchestral versions were arranged by John Metcalfe with Peter Gabriel except "Signal To Noise" which was arranged by Peter Gabriel and Will Gregory and "The Book of Love", which was arranged by Nick Ingman. The songs were conducted by Ben Foster, who is best known for his work on the BBC science fiction series Doctor Who, except "In Your Eyes" which was conducted by John Metcalfe.

Reception

In The Independent, Andy Gill gave the album three stars out of five and said, "the overall effect can be gruelling. At best, the new arrangements open up dark alleyways of meaning, but save for "The Book of Love", where Gabriel's sincerity washes away the irony to leave the song more straightforwardly affectionate, the new meanings are rarely optimistic."

Track listing

References

External links
Live Blood at PeterGabriel.com

2012 live albums
Peter Gabriel albums
Real World Records live albums
Virgin Records live albums